One on One: Dr. J vs. Larry Bird, commonly known as One on One, is a basketball video game written by Eric Hammond for the Apple II and published by Electronic Arts in 1983. It was initially ported to the Atari 8-bit family, ColecoVision, Commodore 64, and IBM PC (as a self-booting disk). Versions followed for the TRS-80 Color Computer, Macintosh, Amiga, and ZX Spectrum. In Europe, the publisher was Ariolasoft. Atari Corporation released an Atari 7800 port in 1987.

Gameplay
The player controls basketball star Julius Erving or Larry Bird in a game of one-on-one against another player or the computer. The game includes personal fouls, a 24-second shot clock, jumpers, fadeaways, putbacks, and what is likely the first instant replay in video games. It allows for play to a certain score or timed games. On offense, a player can spin or shoot; on defense, attempt to block or steal the ball, with over aggressiveness penalized by fouls. A hard dunk can shatter the backboard, prompting a janitor to come out and sweep up the shards, directing censored complaints at the player in the process. The game used Scott Joplin's "Maple Leaf Rag" as its title screen soundtrack.

Development

The game was developed while Trip Hawkins was unsuccessfully attempting to develop a video game based on American football (an effort which eventually led to the creation of the Madden NFL series). Influenced by a televised one-on-one basketball tournament he remembered watching when he was younger, Hawkins decided to create a game based on the concept. He signed Julius Erving, his favorite basketball player at the time. Erving went to Electronic Arts headquarters for principal photography and to offer advice to the developers. Erving and Bird were each paid $25,000 to appear in the game, along with a 2.5 percent royalty. In addition, Erving received some stock in Electronic Arts.

The game's simpler half-court set-up allowed the team to focus on adding more realism, including more accurate physics and animations. A planned feature that would have made Bird and Erving play more similarly to their real-life counterparts did not make the final game.

The cover photograph for the game's record-style package, was taken while Erving and Bird were visiting the Naismith Basketball Hall of Fame. The crowd sounds heard in the Amiga version were recorded by Hawkins and producer Joe Ybarra at a Golden State Warriors game.

Reception
One on One was very successful, helping EA avoid financial difficulty and increasing retailers' familiarity with the company. In 1984 ST.Games readers named the game the eighth most-popular Apple program of 1983. One on One was Electronic Arts' best-selling game, and second best-selling Commodore 64 game, as of late 1987. It was certified "SPA Platinum" (sales of 250,000 copies) by November 1989, after having sold 400,000 copies by late 1988 and becoming the highest-selling sports game ever for computers.

InfoWorld in 1984 called One on One "perhaps the most talked-about sports game of the new year". The magazine praised its portrayal of the two players' individual styles, backboard shattering, crowd noise, and instant replay, concluded that "One On One delivers the goods: a realistic simulation of a lively sports matchup". Computer Gaming World in 1984 called One on One "incredibly realistic" and predicted that it would be one of the year's best sports games. The magazine cited the "absolutely fantastic" graphics, simple controls, and the instant replay as positives, only criticizing the lack of clarity of ball possession under the basket and lack of overtime. ST.Game stated "This is the sports game of 1984", noting the realistic feel of the two players' playing styles. While noting the inability to stop dribbling to fake out the other player, the magazine concluded that "Highly addictive, thrilling, sometimes frustrating, and always involving are ways to describe One-on-One. It's a winner". Ahoy! in 1986 called the Commodore 64 version "a must-have", praising its graphics and gameplay. Compute! in 1986 approved of the Amiga version's improved graphics and sound but noted that the gameplay was the same as on 8-bit computers, stating that this was "a testament to careful research and clever programming" of the original version.

Legacy
The original One on One has been credited as a game that helped establish Electronic Arts as a successful game company and would also foreshadow how important sports titles would be to the company's future. EA Sports would later be spun off into its own division.

The sequel, Jordan vs Bird, was released in 1988 with improved graphics, Michael Jordan taking the Doctor's place, a slam dunk contest with Jordan, and a three-point shootout with Bird.

References

External links

Images of One on One package, manual and screenshots at C64Sets.com
Review in GAMES Magazine
The Computer Chronicles Feb. 28, 1984

1983 video games
Amiga games
Apple II games
Ariolasoft games
Atari 8-bit family games
Atari 7800 games
Basketball video games
ColecoVision games
Commodore 64 games
Electronic Arts games
Classic Mac OS games
TRS-80 Color Computer games
Video games based on real people
Video games featuring black protagonists
Cultural depictions of basketball players
Video games developed in the United States
Multiplayer and single-player video games